Olleya marilimosa is a Gram-negative, aerobic and motile bacterium from the genus of Olleya which has been isolated from the Southern Ocean.

References

Flavobacteria
Bacteria described in 2005